Urbana High School can refer to several different schools:

Urbana High School (Maryland)
Urbana High School (Ohio)
Urbana High School (Illinois)